Elodimyia is a genus of parasitic flies in the family Tachinidae.

Species
Euhygia brevicornis Mesnil, 1963
Euhygia robusta Mesnil, 1952

References

Diptera of Asia
Exoristinae
Tachinidae genera